Nathan John Buddle (born 29 September 1993) is an English professional footballer who plays as a defender for Spennymoor Town. He has previously played for Hartlepool United, Carlisle United and Gateshead.

Career

Youth career
Buddle was born in a small town in Northumberland called Amble. He grew up supporting Newcastle United FC and started out in their under 8’s team and left when he was 14, whilst still at school. Buddle began his senior career with Hartlepool United. Having risen through the youth ranks with the 'monkey-hangers' and having a brilliant couple of years in the youth team, he was released at the end of the 2012–13 season.

Non-League
Buddle then signed a deal with non-league side Blyth Spartans, on non contract terms. He went on to represent the club 83 times during his 2 years with the club, scoring 5 goals from defence. During this period, reached the 3rd round of the FA Cup before finally being knocked out by Championship side; Birmingham City.

Carlisle United
Following some good performances for Blyth, including being part of their incredible FA Cup run which saw them defeat Buddle's former club Hartlepool United, Buddle signed for League Two side Carlisle United following a successful trial spell. The contract lasted until the end of the 2014–15 season. Buddle was then offered a new deal with the cumbrians but opted to sign for Gateshead at the start of the 2015–16 campaign.

Gateshead
Buddle left Carlisle after limited opportunities in Cumbria, and announced that he was signing for National League team Gateshead on 26 June 2015, making his debut in a 2–1 victory over Boreham Wood on 15 August. He scored his first goal for Gateshead in a 1–2 defeat against Welling United on 19 September.

Return to Blyth
On 4 January 2016, former club Blyth Spartans announced Buddle was to return on a 28-day loan, which was finalised three days later. This move was made permanent on 4 February 2016, after his Gateshead contract was cancelled by mutual consent.

Spennymoor Town
On 28 May 2019 it was confirmed, that Buddle had joined Spennymoor Town.

Career statistics

A.  The "League" column constitutes appearances and goals (including those as a substitute) in The Football League, National League and Northern Premier League.
B.  The "Other" column constitutes appearances and goals (including those as a substitute) in the FA Trophy, Northern Premier League Challenge Cup and Northumberland Senior Cup.

References

External links

1993 births
Living people
People from Amble
Footballers from Northumberland
English footballers
Association football defenders
Hartlepool United F.C. players
Blyth Spartans A.F.C. players
Carlisle United F.C. players
Gateshead F.C. players
Northern Premier League players
English Football League players
National League (English football) players
Spennymoor Town F.C. players